Nick Saviano (born June 5, 1956) is an American former tennis player and subsequent tennis coach.

Career
Saviano won one singles title during his career as a pro (1983 Lorraine Open). The left-hander reached his highest individual ranking on the professional ATP Tour on July 12, 1978, when he became the number 48 ranked player in the world. On October 7, 1979, he won a doubles title  with John Lloyd in Hawaii. He was an All-American playing tennis for the Stanford Cardinal and has resided in Sunrise, FL.

Saviano was the coach of Canadian tennis pro Eugenie Bouchard during her greatest successes on the WTA Tour. He also has been the coach of former world No. 3, Sloane Stephens.

Career finals

Singles (1 title, 2 runner-ups)

Doubles (3 titles, 2 runner-ups)

References

External links
 
 

1956 births
Living people
American male tennis players
American people of Italian descent
People from Sunrise, Florida
People from Teaneck, New Jersey
Sportspeople from Bergen County, New Jersey
Stanford Cardinal men's tennis players
Tennis people from Florida
Tennis people from New Jersey
American tennis coaches